Mario Griguol (born April 4, 1937 in Córdoba, Argentina) is an Argentine football coach and former player who played as a forward for clubs of Argentina and Chile.

Teams
 Atlanta 1958–1961
 River Plate 1962–1963
 Ferro Carril Oeste 1964
 San Luis Quillota 1965–1967
 Santiago Wanderers 1968–1969

Honours
Atlanta
 Sweden Cup: 1958

Santiago Wanderers
 Chilean Championship: 1968

External links
 

1937 births
Living people
Argentine footballers
Footballers from Córdoba, Argentina
Association football forwards
Club Atlético Atlanta footballers
Club Atlético River Plate footballers
Ferro Carril Oeste footballers
San Luis de Quillota footballers
Santiago Wanderers footballers
Argentine football managers
Club Atlético Tigre managers
Argentine expatriate footballers
Argentine expatriate sportspeople in Chile
Expatriate footballers in Chile